The 1914–15 William & Mary Indians men's basketball team represented the College of William & Mary in intercollegiate basketball during the 1914–15 season. Under the second year of head coach Dexter W. Draper, the team finished the season with a 5–8 record. This was the 10th season in program history for William & Mary, whose nickname is now the Tribe.

Schedule

|-
!colspan=9 style="background:#006400; color:#FFD700;"| Regular season

Source

References

William & Mary Tribe men's basketball seasons
William And Mary Indians
William and Mary Indians Men's Basketball Team
William and Mary Indians Men's Basketball Team